Sans Souci is a historic home located at Hillsborough, Orange County, North Carolina.  It was built about 1813, as two-story, three bay, frame dwelling with a gable roof and set on a brick foundation. Later additions included -story flanking wings added in the Federal period and a Greek Revival shed addition built in the mid-19th century across the rear of the main block and the east wing.  Also on the property are the contributing kitchen, office, and servant's quarters.

It was listed on the National Register of Historic Places in 1971.  It is located in the Hillsborough Historic District.

References

External links

Historic American Buildings Survey in North Carolina
Houses on the National Register of Historic Places in North Carolina
Greek Revival houses in North Carolina
Federal architecture in North Carolina
Houses completed in 1813
Hillsborough, North Carolina
Houses in Orange County, North Carolina
National Register of Historic Places in Orange County, North Carolina
Individually listed contributing properties to historic districts on the National Register in North Carolina
Plantation houses in North Carolina